Christian Labeau is a Belgian actor and director.

External links 

 
  Biography on the web site of Alter Ego
  Acting career summary (from L'Annuaire du Spectacle on the Centre de recherche et de documentation littéraires et théâtrales de la Communauté française de Belgique web site)

Belgian male actors
Living people
Year of birth missing (living people)